Spring Township may refer to

 Spring Township, Jefferson County, Arkansas
 Spring Township, Lincoln County, Arkansas
 Spring Township, Searcy County, Arkansas
 Spring Township, Boone County, Illinois
 Spring Township, Cherokee County, Iowa
 Spring Township, Butler County, Kansas
 Spring Township, Alfalfa County, Oklahoma
 Spring Township, Woods County, Oklahoma
 Spring Township, Snyder County, Pennsylvania
 Spring Township, Perry County, Pennsylvania
 Spring Township, Crawford County, Pennsylvania
 Spring Township, Centre County, Pennsylvania
 Spring Township, Berks County, Pennsylvania
 Spring Township, Spink County, South Dakota

Township name disambiguation pages